The Fan can refer to:

Places
Fan district, a neighborhood in Richmond, Virginia
Beijing National Indoor Stadium (nicknamed: The Fan), Beijing, China; a facility built for the 2008 Olympics, and used in the 2022 Olympics/Paralympics

Literature
The Fan (play), 1763 and 1765 comedy by Carlo Goldoni
The Fan (Abrahams novel), a 1995 novel by US author Peter Abrahams
The Fan (Randall novel)

Films and TV
The Fan (1949 film), starring Martita Hunt and directed by Otto Preminger
The Fan (1981 film), starring Lauren Bacall, Michael Biehn, Dwight Schultz and Hector Elizondo based on The Fan, a 1977 novel by author Bob Randall
Der Fan (1982), starring Désirée Nosbusch and Bodo Steiger
The Fan (1996 film), starring Robert De Niro and Wesley Snipes, and directed by Tony Scott
La Fan, Mexican telenovela 2017 
"The Fan", the fifth episode of the Tenacious D TV series
The Fan, a villain from anime Triangle Heart
The Fan, 2018 South Korean TV variety, SBS
The Fan (rugby league), a Fox League show

Radio
The Fan, the on-air brand of sport radio stations in Canada owned by Rogers Communications, including CJCL (AM) in Toronto, Ontario and CFAC (AM) in Calgary, Alberta
The Fan, the on-air brand of sports radio stations in the United States owned by CBS Radio, most notably WFAN in New York City; the "Fan" branding is also used many radio stations under other owners throughout the United States

Other Uses
 The Fan (card game), another name for La Belle Lucie, a patience game

See also
Fan (disambiguation)